Stylidium divergens is a dicotyledonous plant that belongs to the genus Stylidium (family Stylidiaceae) that was described as a new species in 2000. The specific epithet divergens means diverging or separating, referring to the widely spreading posterior petals. It is an erect annual plant that grows from 7 to 27 cm tall. Obovate, orbicular, or elliptical leaves, about 2-6 per plant, form a basal rosette. The leaves are generally 4–21 mm long and 3–5 mm wide. This species generally has one to six scapes and cymose inflorescences that are 4–24 cm long. Flowers are white or mauve. S. divergens is endemic to Kakadu National Park in the Northern Territory of Australia. Its typical habitats are sandstone slopes and gullies. It flowers in the southern hemisphere in April. S. divergens is most closely related to S. accedens. Its conservation status has been assessed as data deficient.

See also 
 List of Stylidium species

References 

Asterales of Australia
Carnivorous plants of Australia
Flora of the Northern Territory
divergens
Plants described in 2000